An Ideal Husband is a 2000 film based on the 1895 play An Ideal Husband by Oscar Wilde.

Plot 
While the film retains the premise of Wilde's play and much of the original dialogue, it updates the action to the present day. The external scenes of the film were shot at various locations in the English 'home counties', principally in Buckinghamshire

Sir Robert Chiltern, a rich landowner, belongs to the English 'county set' and is a member of an (unnamed) local government authority somewhere north of London. Well-off and with a loving and trusting wife, his honour and very existence are threatened when Mrs. Laura Cheveley appears with evidence of a past misdeed of Sir Robert's. It transpires that Robert's wealth stems from insider trading concerning a proposed canal project at an unspecified location.

She attempts to blackmail Sir Robert into supporting the project - in which she has invested heavily - and in desperation, Sir Robert turns for help to his friend Lord Goring, an apparently idle philanderer. Goring knows the lady from years before.

After several varieties of machination, the story ends happily. Lord Goring marries Robert's sister Mabel, Mrs. Chevely is outsmarted, and Lady Chiltern retains her faith in her husband's honour and 'idealism'.

Cast 
 Trevyn McDowell – Lady Gertrude Chiltern
 Jonathan Firth – Lord Arthur Goring
 Sadie Frost – Mrs. Laura Cheveley
 James Wilby – Sir Robert Chiltern
 Robert Hardy – Lord Caversham
 Prunella Scales – Lady Markby
 Helena Hughes – James the servant

References

External links 
 

2000 films
2000 comedy films
British comedy films
British films based on plays
Films based on works by Oscar Wilde
2000s English-language films
2000s British films